Bobby Hutcherson Live at Montreux (also released as Bobby Hutcherson Live: Cookin' with Blue Note at Montreux) is a live album by American jazz vibraphonist Bobby Hutcherson recorded at the Montreux Jazz Festival in 1973 and released on the Blue Note label in Japan and Europe only. The album was rereleased on CD with one additional performance from the concert as a bonus track.

Reception 
The Allmusic review by Michael G. Nastos awarded the album 4 stars and stated "Hutch and Shaw have ample room for solos, and they prove why they are the best in the business at inventing improvisations based on these viable themes. Ten years after these recordings, Shaw and Hutcherson would reunite for the trumpeter's Elektra Musician dates Night Music and Master of the Art. This excellent performance provides a perfect prelude to those equally potent sessions, and all come highly recommended".

Track listing 
All compositions by Bobby Hutcherson except as indicated
 " Anton's Bail" - 12:34
 "The Moontrane" (Woody Shaw) - 10:42
 "Farallone" - 13:11 Bonus track on CD reissue
 "Song of Songs" (Shaw) - 13:50
 Recorded at the Montreux Jazz Festival in Montreux, Switzerland on July 5, 1973.

Personnel 
 Bobby Hutcherson – vibes
 Woody Shaw – trumpet
 Cecil Bernard – piano
 Ray Drummond – bass
 Larry Hancock – drums

References 

Blue Note Records live albums
Bobby Hutcherson albums
1974 live albums